List of presidents of the National Assembly of Panama.

Below is a list of office-holders from 1956:

References

Sources
Corte Nacional Electoral, http://bdigital.binal.ac.pa/bdp/descarga.php?f=Palabras%20Llanas.pdf

Government of Panama
Panama, National Assembly